Xiyuan station is an interchange station between Line 4 and Line 16 of the Beijing Subway. Also, there is enough space to build another platform in between Line 4 and Line 16 platform for a potential Line 15 westward extension. The station was the terminus of Line 16 until December 31, 2020, when it was extended south to Ganjiakou.

Station layout 
Both the line 4 and line 16 stations have underground island platforms.

Exits 
There are 5 exits, lettered A, B1, B2, C1, and C2. Exit A is accessible.

Gallery

References

External links
 
Xiyuan Station - Beijing MTR Corporation Limited

Beijing Subway stations in Haidian District
Railway stations in China opened in 2009